The Trinidad and Tobago Defence Force (TTDF) is the military organization responsible for the defence of the twin island Republic of Trinidad and Tobago. It consists of the Trinidad and Tobago Regiment, the Trinidad and Tobago Coast Guard, the Trinidad and Tobago Air Guard and the Defence Force Reserves.

Organisation
Established in 1962 after Trinidad and Tobago's independence from Great Britain, the TTDF is one of the largest Military forces in the English-speaking Caribbean. Its mission statement is to "defend the sovereign good of The Republic of Trinidad and Tobago, contribute to the development of the national community and support the State in the fulfillment of its national and international objectives". The Trinidad and Tobago Defence Force is made up of four distinct arms; The Regiment/"Army", the Coast Guard (TTCG), the Air Guard (TTAG) and the Defence Force Reserves (TTDFR), which all fall under the authority of the Ministry of National Security. The TTDF has the world's only Military steelband.

The Commander in Chief of the Defence Force is the country's President, Paula-Mae Weekes. The current Chief of Defence Staff is Air Vice Marshall Darryl Daniel, who replaced Rear Admiral Hayden Pritchard upon his retirement on 25 March 2019.

Regiment (Army)

The Trinidad and Tobago Regiment (TTR) is the main ground force element of the Trinidad and Tobago Defence Force. It has approximately 3000 men and women, organized into four (4) battalions and a Regiment Headquarters. The regiment has two primary roles; Maintaining the internal security of Trinidad and Tobago and support to civil law enforcement. The current Commanding Officer is Colonel Peter Ganesh.

Also, as one of the larger military forces in the region, the Trinidad and Tobago Regiment is also one of the main units used in peacekeeping and humanitarian situations from the Caribbean region.

Although it is called the Trinidad & Tobago Regiment, the TTR is in fact structured more like a light infantry brigade, with a pair of infantry battalions, plus engineering and logistic support units:

1st Battalion (Infantry), Trinidad and Tobago Regiment: 
This is a light infantry battalion. It is located at Camp Ogden, Long Circular Road, St James.

2nd Battalion (Infantry), Trinidad and Tobago Regiment: This is also a light infantry battalion. 
Formerly located at Camp Mausica, since then it has been relocated to the Chaguaramas Heliport and La Romain.

3rd Battalion (1st Engineer Battalion): This provides engineering support, humanitarian assistance and disaster relief. 
It is located at Camp Cumuto, Wallerfield.

4th Battalion (Support and Service Battalion): This provides logistic and administrative support for the regiment. 
It is located at the Teteron Barracks, Teteron Bay, Chaguaramas.

The Regiment also maintains a Camp Omega, at Chaguaramas, which is used primarily for infantry training.

Special Forces
Trinidad and Tobago has a unique and highly trained group of special forces that is tasked to fulfill counter narcotics and counter terrorism operations. Soldiers are sent to the United States or the United Kingdom for their training. Their motto is "To Find a Way."
There is also a secret elite branch of the TTCG their name Special Naval Unit (SNU).

Coast Guard

The Trinidad and Tobago Coast Guard is the seagoing branch of the TTDF which was established on 1 June 1962 and commissioned into service less than 3 months later on 27 August 1962. The Coast Guard consists of a number of vessels designated CG<number>. The current Commanding Officer is Captain Don Polo.

Its mission statements is "To Defend the Sovereign Good of the Republic of Trinidad and Tobago and to provide on a continuous basis, quality service for security and safety within the Maritime Boundaries, and in any other area of responsibility agreed to by the State to fulfill its International Obligations".

Its motto is "Service Before Self".

The Coast Guard is primarily involved with Drug Trade interdiction as well as Search and Rescue within the waters of Trinidad and Tobago and neighbouring Islands. However, the Coast Guard has been involved in major incidents. During the 1970 Army Mutiny in Trinidad and Tobago, the Coast Guard prevented the mutineers from convoying to Port of Spain by firing on an access road from the Regiment base at Teteron Barracks in Chaguaramas. The Coast Guard also played a role during the 1990 Jamaat al Muslimeen coup attempt, providing logistical and naval support to the ground forces of the Regiment, posted outside the besieged city limits.

National Roles of the Trinidad and Tobago Coast Guard include:
 Surveillance of the Waters under T & T Jurisdiction
 Logistical Support to T & T Land Forces
 Port Security (ISPS Code)
 Assistance in Scientific Research
 Aid to Civil Law Enforcement
 Anti-Smuggling / Counter-Narcotic Operations (MOF)
 Fisheries Protection and Enforcement (MAL&MR)
 Pollution Surveillance and Enforcement (MPU&E)
 Safety of Shipping (MOW&T)

Operational Tasks
 Keeping surveillance of the nation's off-shore installations
 Environmental protection, minor salvage and local maritime surveys
 Cooperating with other naval forces.

Fleet
Between 2001 and 2016 the Trinidad and Tobago Coast Guard fleet included TTS Nelson, an  purchased from the Royal Navy. 

In April 2007, the Coast Guard contracted for three offshore patrol vessels from VT Shipbuilding (later BAE Systems Surface Ships) in Portsmouth, England. Construction of the s Port of Spain, Scarborough and San Fernando suffered significant delays and, in September 2010, though substantially complete, the Government of Trinidad and Tobago cancelled the order. The Brazilian Navy acquired all three ships as their s.

On 29 April 2015 the Ministry of National Security placed orders with the Dutch company Damen Shipbuilders for four   coastal patrol vessels, two  fast utility boats and six   interceptors.

In August 2018, the government contracted with Austal to build two s at Henderson, Western Australia, scheduled for delivery in mid-2020. The two vessels, Port of Spain and Scarborough were delivered to the TTCG in May 2021.

Air Guard 

The Air Wing of the Trinidad and Tobago Defence force was formed on 15 February 1966, and was initially part of the Trinidad and Tobago Coast Guard and was called the Air Wing of the Coast Guard or the Air Wing. In 1977, it was separated as its own entity. In 2005 it was renamed the Trinidad & Tobago Air Guard (TTAG). Its bases are at Piarco International Airport, Crown Point International Airport, and the Heliport at Chaguaramas. Its purposes are to protect and patrol Trinidad and Tobago's airspace, and is also used for transport, search and rescue, and liaison. The current commander of the Air Guard is Group Captain Kester Weekes. He has taken command of the unit in 2019, succeeding Air Commodore Daryl Daniel upon his promotion to Chief of Defence Staff in March 2019.

Aircraft

Current inventory 

Its former fleet of aircraft included:
One Cessna 337 (O-2A) Skymaster (1966–1972), One Cessna 402 Utililiner (1972–1998), four Aérospatiale Gazelle (1973–1995), One Cessna 172 Skyhawk (1991–1998), Two Piper Navajo 2000–2009, One Cessna 310 1985-2011

Four Agusta Westland AW139 helicopters was intended to be used for surveillance and reconnaissance missions related to search and rescue, border patrol and drug interdiction. Due to lack of funding for maintenance, all helicopters was grounded since 2017. In December 2020, The Minister of National Security announced that one AW139 is back up in the air.

The Minister of National Security announced that the establishment of a military airfield, construction of an operations/administrative building at the Piarco Air Station and new helicopters would be purchased to equip the Air Guard. The minister also promised training from various international bodies. Cabinet agreed to the change of rank designations from naval to the corresponding aviation designations and the creation of 66 ranks on the establishment of the Air Guard.

Defence Force Reserves 

The Defence Force Reserves, previously called the Volunteer Defence Force, is the non-active duty arm of the Trinidad and Tobago Defence Force. Its mission statement is "To be a highly professional, well-trained combat-ready force that will respond effectively in support of our regular forces and the national community". The Defence Force Reserves is capable of providing reinforcement and be a force multiplier in the event that the Defence Force is called upon to carry out its roles of aid to the civil power. Established in September 1963, its primary purpose at that time was to provide essential reinforcements to the regular force. Today, those roles have grown to include assisting in the promotion of hemispheric and international security and development, with a well-equipped force, trained in a broad range of disciplines and actively involved in community development. In recent years, the Reserves have been called out to assist with law enforcement and most recently to assist with the security in Trinidad's hosting the 5th Summit of the Americas in 2009.

Ranks

References and links

External links
 Trinidad and Tobago Defence Force official web site
 

 
1962 establishments in Trinidad and Tobago
Military units and formations established in 1962